Baolong may refer to:

Guangzhou Baolong Motors, defunct Chinese car maker
Powerlong or Baolong, Chinese real estate company

See also
Xia Baolong